Poroniec  is a hostile and malicious demon from Slavic mythology. They were believed to come into existence from stillborn fetuses, but also from improperly buried remains of children who had died during infancy.

Folklore

A poroniec is somewhat similar to a being from Scandinavian folklore - Myling. Porońce (plural) were considered to be extremely powerful demons, due to their potential of unrealized life.

Porońce were associated with many taboos regarding pregnant women, such as prohibition of drawing water from the well, prohibition of leaving home with an infant and prohibition of engaging in sexual intercourse.

Stillborn fetus did not turn into a poroniec if it was buried under the threshold of the house. Instead, it turned into a kłobuk – a protective house spirit.

In popular culture
In the 2015 videogame The Witcher 3: Wild Hunt, one of the main quests revolves around the search for a botchling ("poroniec" in the original version) that can be killed or turned into a lubberkin ("kłobuk").

See also
 Drekavac (the South Slavic equivalent)
 Myling
 Pontianak
 Konaki-jiji

References

Slavic legendary creatures
Slavic demons
Undead
Stillbirth